Phyllonorycter ganodes is a moth of the family Gracillariidae. It is known from India.

The larvae feed on Malus domestica, Malus pumila and Malus sylvestris. They probably mine the leaves of their host plant.

References

ganodes
Moths of Asia
Moths described in 1918